Eleusis was an ancient town on the island of Thera, mentioned by Ptolemy. 

Its site is tentatively located near Vlychada.

References

Populated places in the ancient Aegean islands
Former populated places in Greece
Ancient Thera